This page lists the city flags in North America. It is a part of the Lists of city flags, which is split into continents due to its size.

Belize

Bermuda

Canada

Costa Rica

Cuba

Dominican Republic

El Salvador

Historical

Greenland

Guatemala

Haiti

Honduras

Jamaica

Mexico

Nicaragua

Panama

Saint Lucia

Saint Pierre and Miquelon

Trinidad and Tobago

United States

Puerto Rico

See also 
 List of city flags in Africa
 List of city flags in Asia
 List of city flags in Europe
 List of city flags in Oceania
 List of city flags in South America

References

External links 
 Belize: Municipal flags of Belize by Flags of the World.
 Bermuda: Municipal and Parish flags of Bermuda by Flags of the World.
 Canada: Municipal flags of Canada by Flags of the World.
 Cuba: Municipal flags of Cuba by Flags of the World.
 El Salvador: Municipal flags of El Salvador by Flags of the World.
 Greenland: Municipal flags of Greenland by Flags of the World.
 Greenland: Former municipal flags of Greenland by Flags of the World.
 Guatemala: Municipal flags of Guatemala by Flags of the World.
 Honduras: Municipal flags of Honduras by Flags of the World.
 Mexico: City and Municipal flags of Mexico by Flags of the World.
 Nicaragua: Municipal flags of Nicaragua by Flags of the World.
 Panama: Municipal flags of Panama by Flags of the World.
 Puerto Rico: Municipal flags of Puerto Rico by Flags of the World.
 Trinidad and Tobago: Municipal flags of Trinidad and Tobago by Flags of the World.
  United States: Municipal flags of the United States by Flags of the World.